Lambda Omega was a national collegiate sorority operating in the United States from October 31, 1915 until 1933.

History 
The Norroena Club was founded in 1915 on the campus of University of California, Berkeley. The sorority remained a local for seven years. The name meant "Breath of the North". The ritual combined a Native American legend with a Norse motif. The motif emphasized the hardihood, hospitality, economy, and friendship of the Norse (Miner, p. 180).

In 1923, the name changed to Lambda Omega. Expansion began immediately. By 1931, eight collegiate chapters had been chartered, with a total membership of 500. The sorority was granted associate membership in the National Panhellenic Conference (Martin, p. 70.)

In 1933, Lambda Omega and Alpha Sigma Delta, which had joined Lambda Omega just 17 months earlier, were absorbed by Theta Upsilon (Miner, p. 180).

Insignia and Traditions 
 Open Motto- I Will Be Worthy
 Pledge pin- Silver pharetra
 Member pin- Monogram of sorority letters
 Colors- Violet and green
 Flower- Wood violet
 Jewel- Amethyst
 Symbols- Pharetra, Torch
 Patron- Artemis
 Publications- The Pharetra (1925) The Norroena (esoteric, 1925)

(Martin, p. 70)

Chapters
Active chapters at the merger are noted in bold, inactive chapters noted in italics.

Alpha Sigma Delta Sorority 

Iaqua Club was founded in 1919 at Berkeley (Miner, p. 181). It changed its name to Alpha Sigma Delta and had four chapters by the time it was absorbed by Lambda Omega.  The Baird's archive notes that "supposedly five chapters were established." The known chapter list follows:

Chapters of Alpha Sigma Delta

Alpha Sigma Delta published a quarterly magazine, called The Crown.

The badge was a shield of red enamel, bearing the Greek letters vertically.

The colors were Gold and White.

Alpha Sigma Delta merged with Lambda Omega in

1962 merger with Delta Zeta 
Lambda Omega and Alpha Sigma Delta sororities, through their absorption by Theta Upsilon, have their legacies in Delta Zeta sorority. In 1962, Theta Upsilon joined Delta Zeta (Miner, p. 181).

References 

 Martin, Ida Shaw (1931). The Sorority Handbook, 11th edition. Published by Ida Shaw Martin, Boston, Massachusetts.
 Miner, Florence Hood (1983). Delta Zeta Sorority 1902- 1982: Building on Yesterday, Reaching for Tomorrow. Published by Delta Zeta Sorority, Compolith Graphics and Maury Boyd and Associates, Inc, Indianapolis, Indiana.

Delta Zeta
Defunct former members of the National Panhellenic Conference
1915 establishments in the United States
Student organizations established in 1915